A city centre is the commercial, cultural and often the historical, political, and geographic heart of a city. The term "city centre" is primarily used in British English, and closely equivalent terms exist in other languages, such as "" in French,  in German, or shìzhōngxīn in Chinese. In the United States, the term "downtown" is generally used, though a few cities, like Philadelphia, use the term "Center City", while others such as Portland use the term “City Center".

Overview and related concepts

The city centre is the (often historical) area of a city where commerce, entertainment, shopping, and political power are concentrated. The term is commonly used in many English-speaking countries and has direct equivalents in many other languages. However, noticeably, in the United States, the term "downtown" is commonly used to denote a city centre, and in Canada the terms "city centre" and "downtown" are used interchangeably, most notable in the modern, purpose-built cores of former boroughs or newer suburban cities that had no traditional urban core (i.e. North York City Centre and Mississauga City Centre). In Australia, the term "Central Business District" is widely used to refer to the city centre, but usage of the term "City Centre" is increasing, especially in Melbourne. In South Africa, "CBD" is used in formal contexts, but in informal contexts, the city centre is referred to as "town", and despite the growth of decentralised CBDs such as Sandton and uMhlanga "town" continues to refer to the original CBDs of cities.

In many cities, the Central Business District (CBD) is within the city centre, but the concept "city centre" differs from the CBD. The concept of the "CBD" revolves solely around economic and financial power, but the "city centre" also includes historical, political, and cultural factors. A clear example is Paris: La Défense is the central business district of Paris, but it is not the city centre. In most larger and/or older cities, the CBD and the city centre will only partially overlap, if at all.

A city centre is often the first settled part of a city, which can make it the most historical part of a city.

Usage

Australia
In most Australian cities, the city centre to some extent coincides with the central business district, with the result that "the City", "city centre", and "central business district" or "CBD" are regarded as near-synonyms. However, in some Australian cities, the city centre and the CBD are geographically separately identified. In Sydney and Brisbane, for example, the term "CBD" is the preferred term for the city centre. The term "CBD" is not often used in the capital Canberra, where the primary activity is government; its "city centre" is usually identified as the district called "City" or "Civic".

China
In Chinese, the urban centre of a city is called the "city centre" or "urban core". In many cities, it is the historical city centre and the cultural and commercial centre. Historically, the CBD often occupied one portion of the city centre. In recent years, larger cities have often developed CBDs or financial districts that occupy a part of the city centre or are outside the historical city centre completely. For example, Beijing's historical city centre is defined by the former city walls and remains the political and cultural centre of the city, but Beijing's CBD sits in Chaoyang District, to the east of the historical city; Shanghai's city centre was defined by the Old Chinese City, the International Settlement and the French Concession and sat on the west bank of the Huangpu River, whereas the modern financial district is concentrated on Lujiazui, a newly developed area across the river from the traditional city centre (although parts of the traditional city centre remain key financial and business centres).

Netherlands
In Dutch, the terms binnenstad, centrum, stadscentrum, or stadskern are used to describe the city centre. Amsterdam is a clear example of the city centre and the central business district not being the same area. The city centre of Amsterdam is Centrum, the historical heart of the city, but the CBD areas of Amsterdam are Omval in the southeast and Zuidas, in the south. Additionally, Westpoort serves as the city's industrial park.

Because of the bombardment of Rotterdam during World War II, with the loss of its historical core, the city centre and the CBD are the same area in Rotterdam.

See also
 100 percent corner
 Administrative centre
 Central business district
 Inner city
 Town centre

References

Urban studies and planning terminology
City